Brioc (Breton: Brieg; ; ; ; died c. 502) was a 5th-century Welsh holy man who became the first abbot of Saint-Brieuc in Brittany. He is one of the seven founder saints of Brittany.

Life
Very little is known about Brioc's early life, as his 9th century Acta is not altogether reliable. It states that he came from Ceredigion where the church at Llandyfriog was originally dedicated to him. He received his education in Ireland and then studied under Germanus of Auxerre. He is believed to have spent time at Rothesay on the Isle of Bute in Scotland, where a church was dedicated to him and his name was commemorated in the annual St. Bruix Fair.  He most likely returned to France early in 431, accompanied by Illtud.

In 480, he settled in Armorica, and founded a monastery at Landebaeron. He then traveled to Upper Brittany where he established an oratory at St Brieuc-des-Vaux, between St. Malo and Land Triguier, where he eventually became the abbot of a monastery.

Authorities differ as to date of Brioc's death, but it was probably in 502, or in the early years of the sixth century. He died in his own monastery at St. Brieuc-des-Vaux and was interred in his cathedral church, dedicated to Saint Stephen.
Rothesay, Bute

Veneration
His Acta cites numerous miracles, especially his cure of Count Riguel, who gave Brioc his own Palace of Champ-du-Rouvre as also the whole manorial estates. He is represented as treading on a dragon or presented with a column of fire as seen at his ordination.

Brioc's relics were moved to the Church of Saints Sergius and Bacchus of Angers in 865, and again, in a more solemn manner, on 31 July 1166. However, in 1210, a portion of the relics was restored to St. Brieuc Cathedral, where Brioc's ring is also preserved. 

In honour of Brioc's link between Ceredigion and Brittany, the town of St Brieuc has been twinned with Aberystwyth since 1974 and a road, Boulevard St Brieuc, is located in the town. 

His feast day is 1 May. The festival of Saint Brioc was celebrated on 1 May, but in 1804, the festival has been held on the second Sunday after Easter. Churches in England, Ireland, and Scotland are dedicated to this early Celtic saint, including the parish church of St Breock in Cornwall. 

He is considered the patron saint of pursemakers.

See also

Julian Maunoir, "Apostle of Brittany"
Breage, reputed founder of Breage, Cornwall
Brixham, thought to be named for Brioc, possibly St Brioc
Chronological list of saints in the 6th century
List of Breton saints
List of Catholic saints
List of Welsh saints
St Briavels, Gloucestershire, believed to be named for St Brioc
Tudy of Landevennec

References

500s deaths
Medieval Welsh saints
Welsh Roman Catholic saints
Medieval Breton saints
Medieval Cornish saints
French abbots
People from Ceredigion
6th-century Christian saints
Year of birth unknown
Roman Catholic monks
5th-century Breton people